Harbour Glacier is a glacier flowing north from Wilson Piedmont Glacier into Granite Harbour east of the Couloir Cliffs, Victoria Land, Antarctica, where it forms the Harbour Glacier Tongue. It was named by the Advisory Committee on Antarctic Names in 2005, in association with "Harbour Ice Tongue" (now Harbour Glacier Tongue), which was named by the British Antarctic Expedition, 1910–13.

References

Glaciers of Victoria Land
Scott Coast